During the 2006–07 English football season, Sheffield United competed in the FA Premier League, after being promoted from the Football League Championship the previous season.

Kit
The kit was manufactured by French company Le Coq Sportif and sponsored by American bank Capital One.

Season summary
Several good results, including a home draw against Liverpool on the first day of the season and wins over Arsenal and Newcastle United saw Sheffield United keep ahead of the relegation zone for much of the season. However, West Ham United's late run of good form, combined with a broken leg suffered by top scorer Rob Hulse against Chelsea that left the Blades lacking firepower up front, saw Sheffield United sucked into the relegation battle and they were relegated on the final day of the season on goal difference after losing at home to Wigan Athletic; a draw would have been good enough to keep United up. Wigan Athletic's win kept them up at United's expense and in a twist of fate, David Unsworth, who had started the season at Sheffield United and had been let go in January 2007 on a free transfer, scored the goal that sent down former club Sheffield United, whilst simultaneously saving Wigan Athletic from relegation, 3 minutes after arriving on the pitch as substitute.

Players

First-team squad
Squad at end of season

Left club during season

Reserve squad
The following players did not appear for the first-team this season.

Transfers

In
  Mikele Leigertwood -  Crystal Palace, £600,000 (compensation), May 2006
  David Sommeil -  Manchester City, free transfer, 24 May 2006
  Claude Davis -  Preston North End, £3,000,000, 14 June 2006
  Christian Nadé -  Troyes, 27 June 2006
  Li Tie -  Everton, free transfer, July 2006 
  Rob Hulse -  Leeds United, £2,200,000 rising to £3,000,000, 24 July 2006
  Ian Bennett -  Leeds United, undisclosed, 27 July 2006
  Colin Kazim-Richards -  Brighton & Hove Albion, £150,000, 31 August 2006
  Paul Gerrard -  Nottingham Forest, free transfer, 27 September 2006
  Matthew Kilgallon -  Leeds United, £1,750,000 rising to £2,000,000, 8 January 2007
  Jon Stead - Sunderland, £750,000 rising to £1,250,000, 11 January 2007
  Mamadou Seck -  Le Havre, free, 15 January 2007
  Luton Shelton -  Helsingborg, £2,000,000, 15 January 2007
  Ahmed Fathy -  Ismaily SC, £700,000, 24 January 2007

Out
  Brian Deane - retired, 2006
  Garry Flitcroft - retired, 2006
  Kyle Nix - released
  Gary Mulligan -  Gillingham, 12 May 2006
  Bruce Dyer - released (later joined  Doncaster Rovers on 2 June 2006)
  Simon Francis -  Southend United, undisclosed, 13 June 2006
  Phil Barnes -  Grimsby Town, undisclosed, 29 June 2006
  Luke Beckett -  Huddersfield Town, £85,000, 3 July 2006
  David Unsworth -  Wigan Athletic, free transfer, 5 January 2007
  Neil Shipperley - released (later joined  Brentford), 15 January 2007
  Paul Ifill -  Crystal Palace, £800,000, January 2007
  Ade Akinbiyi -  Burnley, £650,000 rising to £750,000, January 2007

Final league table

Results
Sheffield United's score comes first

Legend

FA Premier League

Results summary

Results per matchday

FA Cup

League Cup

Statistics

Appearances and goals

|-
! colspan=14 style=background:#dcdcdc; text-align:center| Goalkeepers

|-
! colspan=14 style=background:#dcdcdc; text-align:center| Defenders

|-
! colspan=14 style=background:#dcdcdc; text-align:center| Midfielders

|-
! colspan=14 style=background:#dcdcdc; text-align:center| Forwards

|-
! colspan=14 style=background:#dcdcdc; text-align:center| Players transferred out during the season

Notes

References

Sheffield United
Sheffield United F.C. seasons